Tabb High School is a public high school for  located in Tabb, an unincorporated community in southern York County, Virginia, United States. It is part of the York County School Division. The school opened in 1972 and is located near the site of one of the first land battles of the Civil war, the Battle of Big Bethel.

Athletic teams compete in the Virginia High School League's AA Bay Rivers District in Region I. Historically, Tabb High School has been known for its football program, which was dominant in the early 1990s and produced two players for the NFL, Chris Slade and Terry Kirby.

History 
Tabb opened in the fall of 1972. It was without a senior class, and did not have a graduation ceremony until the spring of 1974.

It was considered cutting-edge for its time. It had carpeting, movable walls, air conditioning, and contained two large rooms called kivas in which the teacher worked from the lowest level with five ascending rows in front and on either side. The gymnasium floor was made of Tartan, a rubber surface, which was considered unusual for its time.

The school opened to rave reviews from students, parents and the architectural community. It helped ease overcrowding in York High School.

The original student body was very close, and thrilled to be part of such a unique school. In the summer of 2004, the class of '74 held its 30th reunion. In the spirit of that closeness, they invited the classes of '75 and '76 to participate as well.

Tabb made the playoffs for the first time in 15 years in the '08-'09 football season. The girls' field hockey team won the state championship in the '08-'09 season, '09-'10 season, '10-'11 season, and '11-'12 season, leaving the school with a "four in a row" state championship. They won again in '14, '15, '16, and '21 making eight state championship titles in ten seasons.

Accreditation 
Tabb High is fully accredited by the Virginia Department of Education and has been accredited by the Southern Association of Colleges and Schools since 1972.

Athletics 
Tabb High School fields teams in the following sports. They compete in the AA Bay Rivers District in AA Region I.

Basketball (boys' and girls')
Baseball
Cheer, competition and sideline
Color guard (winter guard)
Cross country
eSports
Field hockey
Football
Golf (boys' and girls')
Lacrosse
Soccer (boys' and girls')
Softball
Swimming/diving (boys' and girls')
Tennis (boys' and girls')
Track, indoor and outdoor (boys' and girls')
Volleyball
Wrestling

Feeder patterns 
Its original drawing area ran from Bethel Manor to Seaford.
 
The school takes in students from the following elementary schools:
 Bethel Manor
 Coventry (partial)
 Grafton Bethel (partial)
 Mount Vernon
 Tabb

All students zoned to Tabb Middle School are zoned to Tabb High School.

Notable alumni 
 Terry Kirby - former National Football League running back
 Wayne Kirby - former Major League Baseball right fielder
 Justin Melton - Philippine Basketball Association point guard
 Lori Robinson - A four-star general in the U.S. Air Force and the first woman to lead a top-tier U.S. Combat Command
 Chris Slade - former National Football League linebacker
 Levar Stoney - Mayor of Richmond Virginia
 Dave Walters - swimmer, world record holder (relay) and 2008 Olympic gold medalist

References

External links
Alumni website
Facebook page
Tabb home page

Schools in York County, Virginia
Public high schools in Virginia
Educational institutions established in 1972
1972 establishments in Virginia